Seeding of a Ghost (种鬼) is a 1983 Hong Kong horror film directed by Chuan Yang.

Plot
Following the prediction of a dark magician, the unfaithful wife of a Hong Kong taxi driver falls victim to a pair of murderous thugs. Outraged, the taxi driver arranges supernatural vengeance with the aid of an unholy union between the dead.

Release
The film was released on DVD in the United States by Image Entertainment in 2008.

References

External links
 
 Seeding of a Ghost at the Hong Kong Movie DataBase
 HK cinemagic entry

Hong Kong horror films
1980s monster movies
1983 films
1983 horror films
1980s Cantonese-language films
Hong Kong supernatural horror films
Hong Kong ghost films
1980s Hong Kong films